A loan agreement is a contract between a borrower and a lender which regulates the mutual promises made by each party. There are many types of loan agreements, including "facilities agreements," "revolvers," "term loans," "working capital loans."  Loan agreements are documented via a compilation of the various mutual promises made by the involved parties.

Prior to entering into a commercial loan agreement, the "borrower" first makes representations about his affairs surrounding his character, creditworthiness, cashflow, and any collateral that he may have available to pledge as security for a loan. These representations are taken into consideration and the lender then determines under what conditions (terms), if any, they are prepared to advance money.

Loan agreements, like any contract, reflect an "offer," the "acceptance of the offer," "consideration," and can only involve situations that are "legal" (a term loan agreement involving heroin drug sales is not "legal").  Loan agreements are documented via their commitment letters, agreements that reflect the understandings reached between the involved parties, a promissory note, and a collateral agreement (such as a mortgage or a personal guarantee).   Loan agreements offered by regulated banks are different from those that are offered by finance companies in that banks receive a "banking charter" granted as a privilege and involving the "public trust."

Loan agreements are usually in written form, but there is no legal reason why a loan agreement cannot be a purely oral contract (although oral agreements are more difficult to enforce).

Types

For commercial banks and large finance companies, "loan agreements" are usually not categorized although "loan portfolios" are often broadly characterized into "personal" and "commercial" loans while the "commercial" category is then subdivided into "industrial" and "commercial real estate" loans. "Industrial" loans are those that depend on the cashflow and creditworthiness of the company and the widgets or service that it sells.  "Commercial real estate" loans are those that repay loans but that depend on the rental revenues paid by tenants who lease space, usually for extended times.  More granular categorizations of loan portfolios exist but these are always variations around the larger themes.

The loan agreements originated by commercial banks, savings banks, finance companies, insurance organizations, and investment banks are very different from each other and all feed a different purpose.  "Commercial banks" and "Savings banks," because they accept deposits and benefit from FDIC insurance, generate loans that incorporate the concepts of the "public trust."  Prior to interstate banking, that "public trust" was easily measured by State bank regulators who could see how local deposits were used to fund the working capital needs of local industry and businesses, and the benefits associated with those organization's employment.  "Insurance" organizations, who collect premiums for providing either life or property/casualty coverage, created their own types of loan agreements.  "Banks" and "Insurance" organizations' loan agreements and documentation standards evolved from their individual cultures and were governed by policies that somehow addressed each organizations liabilities (In the case of "banks," the liquidity needs of their depositors; in the case of insurance organizations, the liquidity needs associated with their expected "claims" payments).

"Investment banks" create loan agreements that cater to the needs of the investors whose funds they attempt to attract; "investors" are always sophisticated and accredited organizations not subject to bank regulatory supervision and the need to cater to the public trust.  Investment banking activities are supervised by the SEC and their main focus is on whether the correct or proper disclosures are made to the parties who provide the funds.

Types of Loans:
 bilateral loans
 syndicated loans

Categorizing loan agreements by type of facility usually results in two primary categories:
 term loans, which are repaid in set installments over the term, or
 revolving loans (or overdrafts) where up to a maximum amount can be withdrawn at any time, and interest is paid from month to month on the drawn amount.

Within these two categories though, there are various subdivisions such as interest-only loans, and balloon payment loans.  It is also possible to subcategorize on whether the loan is a secured loan or an unsecured loan, and whether the rate of interest is fixed or floating.

Promise to  Repay

Forms of loan agreements vary tremendously from industry to industry, country to country, but characteristically a professionally drafted commercial loan agreement will incorporate the following terms:

 Parties to contracts with their addresses
 Definitions or interpretation provisions
 Facility and purpose
 Conditions precedent to utilization
 Repayment provisions
 Prepayment and cancellation provisions
 Interest and interest periods
 Provisions dealing with gross-up in relation to any withholding imposed
 Payments provisions
 Representations of the borrower
 Representations of the lender
 Covenants of the borrower
 Events of default
 Remedies in the event of default
 Provisions for penalties and liquidated damages
 For syndicated loans, provisions relating to the facility agent and security agent and voting of the lenders
 Formulae for calculations
 Provisions for fees of the lenders
 Provisions for expenses
 Securitization provisions
 Amendments and waivers provisions
 Covenants relating to changes in parties
 Set-off clause
 Severability clause
 Counterparts clause
 Addresses for notices
 Language provisions
 Choice of law clause
 Forum selection clause
 Appointment of a process agent

See also
 Debt
 Cleanup clause
 Cov-lite
 Gross-up clause

Footnotes

Contract law
Credit
Loans